is a Japanese dancer, choreographer, and model from Sanmu, Chiba Prefecture, Japan.

Career
Sugawara practiced dancing from around 2002, when she was 10 years old. In her teens, she won various contests such as "Dance Attack" and "Shonen Chample." After graduating from a local public middle school in March 2007, she entered the general course of Seisa Kokusai High School concurrently with dance studies at VAW Eikō High School. After graduating from high school in March 2010, she went to Los Angeles to study dance. In 2013, she collaborated with Nike as a dancer and later also appeared in Nike Athlete's ad campaign.

After returning to Japan, Sugawara worked as a choreographer and backup dancer. She has been a back-up dancer for 2NE1, Girls' Generation, Koda Kumi, Exile, SMAP, Namie Amuro, Rihanna, and Daichi Miura.

Personal life
From September 2016 until November 2017, Sugawara dated actor Haruma Miura.

Filmography

Television

Radio

Advertisements
TDK (2015)
Bose
Nike: #MinoHodoshirazu
Android: Jibun o Omoikiri
Toyota "Vitz" Safety Sense
Barneys New York
#FindYourStrength | Shiseido Altimune | Shiseido

Music video

Choreography credits

Awards

References

External links
 

1992 births
Living people
People from Sanmu
Japanese choreographers
Japanese female dancers
Japanese female models
Models from Chiba Prefecture